The Battle of Sanaa (2017) was fought between forces loyal to Ali Abdullah Saleh and the Houthis in the Yemeni capital of Sana'a. Both sides were allied during the 2014–15 Houthi takeover of the government but the alliance ended when Saleh decided to break ranks with the Houthis and call for dialogue with Saudi Arabia and the United Arab Emirates, who are leading a military intervention in Yemen. Fighting then broke out between the Houthis and forces loyal to Saleh as the Saudi-led coalition began bombing Houthi areas, ultimately resulting in Saleh's death and a Houthi victory.

Background 

The Houthis had formed a tactical alliance with Ali Abdullah Saleh, Yemeni President in 1990–2012, after he was deposed in the 2011 Yemeni revolution to which Houthis themselves had contributed. Houthis were also dissatisfied with the new Yemeni president Abdrabbuh Mansur Hadi who was appointed by the Gulf Cooperation Council and didn't let them a share in the government among other reasons. The dissatisfaction turned into widespread protests when Hadi government ordered removal of fuel subsidies. Houthis organized mass protests and advanced into the capital, Sanaa, taking over government buildings but Hadi and his cabinet finally suddenly resigned leaving office in the hands of Houthis. Soon afterwards, the Saudis led a military intervention in Yemen upon Hadi request against Houthis to restore him to power. Houthis and Saleh forces shared administration of the capital and the country since then.

Pro-Saleh forces controlled Southern Sana'a while Houthis were in control of the northern part of the capital. The tactical alliance between Saleh, who was deposed in 2012, and the Houthis has often appeared fragile, with both groups suspicious of each other's ultimate motives and sharing little ideological ground.

Battle 

On 2 December 2017, four days after the eruption of armed conflict between the Houthis and forces loyal to Ali Abdullah Saleh, he announced his readiness to start a "new page" with Saudi Arabia and United Arab Emirates, a move which was welcome by the two governments. On 4 December 2017, Saleh officially announced the end of his partnership with the Houthis while Saudi Arabia warplanes were bombing Houthi positions in Sana'a in support of Saleh. The conflict took at least 125 lives and injured 238. According to Ra'iy al-Youm, Saleh's split was an outcome of long-term efforts by Saudi Arabia and the UAE to unravel the Houthi-Saleh alliance after their failure to defeat the Houthis militarily.

It was reported on 4 December that the Bani Bahloul tribe gained control of posts of Houthi militias in southern Sanaa. The tribes of al Hima and Hamadan reportedly controlled other Houthi posts and arrested dozens of Houthi militants, according to Sky News. Also, supervisor of the Houthi militias Abu Mohsen al Qahoum was killed in clashes with General People's Congress (GPC) forces in Sha'oub district of Sanaa. Despite this, the battle turned increasingly against the Saleh loyalists, with GPC secretary general Aref al-Zouka being killed in combat. Many GPC members and Saleh fighters also defected to the Houthis.

Death of Saleh 
On 4 December 2017, having declared Saleh and his militias "treasonous", Houthis disabled his vehicle with a rocket-propelled grenade in an ambush when he was on his way to Ma'rib while trying to flee into Saudi-controlled territories and he was subsequently shot in the head by a Houthi sniper. In response, his son Ahmed, former commander of the Republican Guard, pledged vengeance against Houthis. After Saleh's death the forces aligned with him were routed and their commanders fled the city and fighting in the city subsequently ceased but Saudi-led coalition started pounding areas in the city. Saleh's death is described as an embarrassment in a long list of Saudi foreign policy failures under Mohammad bin Salman. The death toll from clashes between GPC forces and Houthi militias in Sanaa has exceeded 200.

On 4 December, The Houthi leader, Abdul-Malik al-Houthi, congratulated the people for "the fall of the conspiracy" that he alleged was instigated by Saudi Arabia and UAE. "We were aware of this conspiracy before it happened and we tried so hard to prevent it in a fraternal way, but the other side was always evasive. We were aware of coordination with the force of aggression and intensive military preparations before they finally reached what they did," he added. Abdul-Malik also noted that it was a certain number of militias and the top leader (Saleh) of the GPC that participated in the sedition while praising "many honorable members of the Congress" who helped Houthis to settle things down.

Aftermath 

On 5 December, tens of thousands of pro-Houthi demonstrators took to the streets in Sanaa. Almasirah, the official Ansar Allah website, reported that the rally was held to "thank God" for the failure of the revolt. The crowd, waving Yemen's national flag, chanted slogans such as "ours is a free revolution, we reject colonization.. through unity and resilience, we defeated the Jewish alliance", according to the website. The rally was reported to have been attended by a large number of women as well as members of GPC who stated that the plot was aimed at the entire people of Yemen without exception. The celebration has been broadly confirmed by other sources.

A large part of the GPC consequently pledged allegiance to the Houthis, and elected Sadeq Ameen Abu Rass as new chairman. Those GPC elements which stayed loyal to the Saleh family retreated into Hadi-controlled areas and began to rebuild their military strength to fight the Houthis.

See also 
 Battle of Sana'a (2011)
 Battle of Sana'a (2014)

References 

2017 in Yemen
21st century in Sanaa
Sanaa (2017)
Military history of Sanaa
Yemeni Civil War (2014–present)
Sanaa
November 2017 events in Yemen
December 2017 events in Yemen